Sainik (English: Soldier) is a 1993 Indian action film directed by Sikandar Bharti. The film stars Akshay Kumar, Ashwini Bhave, Ronit Roy, Farheen in pivotal roles.

Plot
This movie is about an army officer Suraj Dutt, who is the son of Yashpal Dutt. Suraj goes to meet his sister Minni in at a women's college before he falls in love with Alka. They get married soon, but Suraj is called for a year-long mission. While he is away a message arrives that Suraj has been killed. Minni, Alka and Yashpal each learn about this, but don't tell each other as they feel each other will die upon hearing this. Meanwhile, Minni is about to wed Vijay, but on the day of her wedding, she is kidnapped. 
The movie ends, surprising everyone with the reappearance of Suraj, (who was alive all this while!) who comes and saves Minni and everybody is reunited.

Cast
 Akshay Kumar as Lieutenant Suraj Dutt
 Ashwini Bhave as Alka Dutt
 Ronit Roy as Vijay Ghai
 Farheen as Minni Dutt
 Anupam Kher as Retired Colonel Yashpal Dutt
 Aloknath as Bihari
 Ranjeet as Gajraj Chaudhary
 Laxmikant Berde as Guddu 
 Guddi Maruti as Guddi
 Satish Shah as Alka's Father

Soundtrack
Nadeem-Shravan composed the soundtrack of the film.

External links
 

1993 films
1990s Hindi-language films
Films scored by Nadeem–Shravan

Indian Army in films
Indian action drama films
1990s action drama films